Martin Suchý (born 2 December 1982) is a Slovak football defender.

Suchý previously played for FK Siad Most in the Czech Gambrinus liga and AGOVV Apeldoorn in the Dutch Eerste Divisie.

References

External links
 Profile at Vysočina Jihlava website

1982 births
Living people
Footballers from Bratislava
Slovak footballers
ŠK Slovan Bratislava players
FK Baník Most players
FC Vysočina Jihlava players
AGOVV Apeldoorn players
Czech First League players
Eerste Divisie players
Slovak expatriate footballers
Expatriate footballers in the Netherlands
Slovak expatriate sportspeople in the Netherlands
Association football defenders